Pau is the surname of:

 Akina Pau (born 1974), Hong Kong fencer
 Carlos Pau y Español (1857–1937), Spanish botanist
 Pau Cin Hau, Burmese religious leader
 Joan Margarit i Pau (died 1484), Spanish Roman Catholic bishop and cardinal
 Paul Pau (1848–1932), French general
 Peter Pau (born 1951), Hong Kong cinematographer
 Petra Pau (born 1963), German politician
 Sioe Gouw Pau (born 1935), Indonesian Olympic fencer
 Tyrone Pau, Cook Islander professional rugby league footballer
 Pau Shiu-hung (born 1942), Hong Kong politician